John Angel (d 1568), was an English priest. He sang as a lay clerk in the Choir of King's College, Cambridge after which he was appointed a Gentleman of the Chapel Royal and was present at the funeral of Edward VI, the coronation and funeral of Queen Mary and the coronation of Elizabeth I.

By 1561 he was appointed sub-Dean of the Chapel Royal, which he held unto his death on 17 August 1568, after which he was buried in St Mary le Strand.

He published a work on the Real Presence under the title The Agreement of the Holy Fathers, 1555.

References

16th-century English clergy
English chaplains
Year of death unknown
English religious writers
16th-century English writers
16th-century male writers
Year of birth unknown
English male non-fiction writers
Gentlemen of the Chapel Royal